Jessica Valenti (born November 1, 1978) is an American feminist writer. She was the co-founder of the blog Feministing, which she wrote for from 2004 to 2011. Valenti is the author of five books: Full Frontal Feminism (2007), He's a Stud, She's a Slut (2008), The Purity Myth (2009), Why Have Kids? (2012), and Sex Object: A Memoir (2016). She also co-edited the books Yes Means Yes: Visions of Female Sexual Power and A World Without Rape (2008), and Believe Me: How Trusting Women Can Change the World (2020). Between 2014 and 2018, Valenti was a columnist for The Guardian. She is currently a columnist for Medium.

Early life and education 
Valenti was raised in Long Island City, Queens, in an Italian-American family. She graduated from Stuyvesant High School in New York City in 1996 and attended Tulane University in New Orleans for a year, and then transferred to the State University of New York at Albany, graduating in 2001 with a bachelor's degree in journalism. In 2002, Valenti received a master's degree in Women's and Gender Studies with a concentration in politics from Rutgers University.

Career 
After graduating from college, Valenti worked for the NOW Legal Defense and Education Fund and for the Women's Environment & Development Organization. She wrote a blog for NARAL Pro-Choice America and also taught at Rutgers University from 2008 to 2010.

Feministing 
In April 2004, Valenti co-founded Feministing with her sister and a friend while she was working at the National Organization for Women's legal defense fund (now Legal Momentum). Homa Khaleeli writes in The Guardian's top 100 women that the site shifted the feminist movement online, triggering the creation of blogs and discussion groups, creating a heyday for feminism just as its death was being announced, as Khaleeli puts it. She writes that Valenti "felt the full force of being a pioneer," her involvement with the site attracting online abuse, even threats of rape and death.

Kymberly Blackstock included Feministing in her review of feminist blogs, praising them for being "successful in giving a new generation the chance to engage with as well as begin to direct which topics will rise to the top of the feminist agenda". While she criticized Valenti for the blog's lack of involvement in global issues. She also writes that blogs like Feministing are helpful in encouraging activism in young people, and allow them to see current events with a feminist lens.

University of Wisconsin–Madison law professor Ann Althouse criticized Feministing in 2006 for its sometimes sexualized content. Erin Matson of the National Organization for Women's Young Feminist Task Force told The Huffington Post the controversy was "a rehashing of a very old debate within the feminist community: is public sexuality empowering or harmful to women?"

Valenti left the site in February 2011, saying she wanted it to remain a place for younger feminists.

Writing 
In 2007, Valenti wrote Full Frontal Feminism, where she discusses the ways in which readers can benefit from being feminists.

In 2008, Valenti published He's a Stud, She's a Slut and 49 Other Double Standards Every Woman Should Know.

In 2008, Valenti was the co-editor of Yes Means Yes: Visions of Female Sexual Power and A World Without Rape with Jaclyn Friedman. The anthology featured a foreword by comedian Margaret Cho.

In 2009, Valenti published (via Seal Press) The Purity Myth: How America's Obsession with Virginity Is Hurting Young Women, about the way ideals about women's sexuality are being used to weaken women's rights. A documentary film based on the book, called The Purity Myth, was released in 2011 by the Media Education Foundation.

In 2012, Valenti published Why Have Kids? A New Mom Explores the Truth About Parenting and Happiness.

In 2016, Valenti published Sex Object: A Memoir with the Dey Street imprint of Morrow. The book was a memoir, a departure from Valenti's prior books.

Also in 2016, one of the Podesta emails mentions, alongside Valenti's name, a column she was writing for The Guardian.

In 2020, Valenti was the co-editor of the anthology Believe Me: How Trusting Women Can Change the World with Jaclyn Friedman.

Valenti's writing has appeared in Diane Mapes' Single State of the Union: Single Women Speak Out on Life, Love, and the Pursuit of Happiness (2007), Melody Berger's We Don't Need Another Wave: Dispatches from the Next Generation of Feminists (2008), and Courtney E. Martin and J. Courtney Sullivan's book, Click: When We Knew We Were Feminists (2010).

Her work has appeared in Ms., The Washington Post, AlterNet, as well as other publications. Valenti wrote for The Nation from 2008 to 2014. Since 2014, Valenti has written regularly for The Guardian, where she is a columnist. She also writes a Substack newsletter, Abortion, Every Day, about abortion laws after the overturning of Roe v. Wade.

Harassment 
Valenti has been the target of online threats and harassment throughout her career. In a 2006 blog article by Liz Funks at HuffPost, Funks wrote about online attacks made about Valenti after a group photo that included Valenti at a luncheon with former President Bill Clinton went viral, focusing on her outfit.

In July 2016, Valenti announced she was taking a break from social media, after receiving rape and death threats aimed at her then five-year-old daughter. On Twitter, Valenti denounced the harassment as unacceptable. Immediately after that, Valenti made her Instagram account private.

Personal life
In 2009, Valenti married Andrew Golis, former deputy publisher of Talking Points Memo, former general manager of Vox Media, and currently the Chief Content Officer for WNYC.

The couple has one daughter, born in 2010.

Honors 
 2010: Independent Publisher Book Awards for Gold: The Purity Myth: How America's Obsession with Virginity Is Hurting Young Women
 2011: The Hillman Prize, Blog for Feministing
 2011: The Guardian, Top 100 Inspiring Women
 2014: Planned Parenthood Federation of America, Media Award for Commentary at The Guardian for "The Body Politic" column
 Ibis Reproductive Health, Evidence in Activism Award
 Choice USA Generation Award

Works and publications

Books 
 
 
 
 
 
  – excerpt
 
  – extract

Anthologies

Selected publications

Other 
  – Based on Valenti's book and features Valenti

References

External links 

 
 
 Jessica Valenti at The Guardian
 Jessica Valenti at The Nation
 Jessica Valenti at AlterNet
 Jessica Valenti, Abortion, Every Day at Substack

1978 births
Living people
American bloggers
American feminist writers
American people of Italian descent
Feminist bloggers
People from Long Island City, Queens
Rutgers University alumni
Stuyvesant High School alumni
Writers from Queens, New York
American women bloggers
The Nation (U.S. magazine) people
21st-century American writers
21st-century American women writers
People from Jamaica Plain